Int'l After School is an English-language entertainment and pop-culture-focused programme broadcast on NHK World. It is hosted by MC Wise of Teriyaki Boyz and the members of Cute.

External links
 Int'l After School [link not working]

NHK original programming
Japanese music television series
English-language television shows
2011 Japanese television series debuts